1993 Peach Bowl may refer to:

 1993 Peach Bowl (January), January 2, 1993, game between the North Carolina Tar Heels and the Mississippi State Bulldogs
 1993 Peach Bowl (December), December 31, 1993, game between the Clemson Tigers and the Kentucky Wildcats